Allan MacInnis (born July 11, 1963) is a Canadian former professional ice hockey defenceman who played 23 seasons in the National Hockey League (NHL) for the Calgary Flames (1981-1994) and St. Louis Blues (1994-2004). A first round selection of the Flames in the 1981 NHL Entry Draft, he went on to become a 12-time All-Star. He was named the Conn Smythe Trophy winner as the most valuable player of the playoffs in 1989 after leading the Flames to the Stanley Cup championship. He was voted the winner of the James Norris Memorial Trophy in 1999 as the top defenceman in the league while a member of the Blues. In 2017 MacInnis was named one of the '100 Greatest NHL Players' in history.

MacInnis was most famous for having the hardest shot in the league. He tied Bobby Orr's Ontario Hockey League (OHL) record for goals by a defenceman, and won two OHL championships and a Memorial Cup with the Kitchener Rangers as a junior. He famously split goaltender Mike Liut's mask with a shot, and became only the fourth defenceman in NHL history to score 100 points in a season. Internationally, he was an all-star on defence as Canada won the 1991 Canada Cup and twice participated in the Winter Olympics. He was a member of the 2002 team that won Canada's first gold medal in 50 years.

An eye injury suffered early in the 2003–04 NHL season forced MacInnis into retirement. He finished his career third all-time among defencemen in goals, assists and points and was named to seven post-season all-star teams. He was elected to the Hockey Hall of Fame in 2007, and his jersey number 2 was retired by the Blues and is honoured by the Flames. MacInnis remains a member of the Blues organization, currently serving as the team's Senior Advisor to the General Manager. When the Blues won the Stanley Cup in 2019, he got his name engraved on the Stanley Cup for a second time.

Early life
MacInnis was born in Inverness, Nova Scotia, and grew up in Port Hood, Nova Scotia, a fishing village on Cape Breton Island. He is the seventh of eight children born to Alex and Anna Mae MacInnis, and one of six brothers. His father worked as a coal miner and later as the assistant manager of the arena in Port Hood when the mine closed while his mother was a school teacher. The brothers all played hockey in Port Hawkesbury during the winter. MacInnis often assisted his father's work at the arena, collecting pucks that he used to shoot repeatedly against a sheet of plywood set against the family barn during the summer. It was through this practice, which occasionally left him with blistered fingers, that he developed his powerful slapshot.

Playing career

Junior
MacInnis left home in 1979 to join the Regina Pat Blues of the Saskatchewan Junior Hockey League (SJHL). He appeared in 59 games, scoring 20 goals and 48 points with the Pat Blues, and appeared in two Western Hockey League (WHL) games with the Regina Pats. He then moved to Ontario and joined the Kitchener Rangers of the Ontario Hockey League (OHL). Following a season in which he scored 39 points in 47 games and winning the League Championship with Kitchener in the 1980–81 OHL season, MacInnis was rated as the second best defensive prospect at the 1981 NHL Entry Draft. He was selected by the Calgary Flames in the first round, 15th overall. The Flames invited him to their training camp, although they did not expect him to play for them immediately, and he was returned to junior.

Most of his season was spent with Kitchener where MacInnis was named to the OHL first All-Star team after scoring 75 points for the Rangers. The team won its second consecutive OHL title, and captured the 1982 Memorial Cup. He played a third season in Kitchener in 1982–83, and was again named a first-team All-Star after an 84-point season. Additionally, MacInnis was voted the winner of the Max Kaminsky Trophy as the OHL's top defenceman. He tied Bobby Orr's OHL record for goals by a defenceman in one season with 38 (subsequently broken by Bryan Fogarty's 47 in 1988–89), and holds the Canadian Hockey League record of five goals in one game by a defenceman.

Calgary Flames

MacInnis made his NHL debut with the Flames on December 30, 1981, against the Boston Bruins. He appeared in two games that season, and an additional fourteen in 1982–83 in seasons spent primarily with Kitchener at the junior level. He scored his first NHL point against the Toronto Maple Leafs on October 23, 1982. MacInnis began the 1983–84 season with the Colorado Flames of the Central Hockey League, scoring 19 points in 19 games before joining Calgary full-time. With the Flames, he scored 11 goals and 34 assists in 51 games and appeared in his first 11 post-season games during the 1984 Stanley Cup playoffs.

A point-per-game pace in 1984–85 (66 points in 67 games) earned MacInnis his first All-Star Game appearance, playing in front of his hometown fans at the 1985 game in Calgary. He was voted a second-team All-Star for the 1986–87 NHL season, and started his first All-Star Game in 1988. He was a finalist for the James Norris Memorial Trophy as top defenceman in the league in three consecutive seasons, 1989, 1990 and 1991, but failed to win the award each time.

Led by MacInnis' 31 points, the Flames won the first Stanley Cup championship in their history in 1989. He had four goals and five assists in six games in the final series against the Montreal Canadiens en route to winning the Conn Smythe Trophy as the most valuable player of the playoffs. MacInnis became the first defenceman to lead the league in post-season scoring, and he finished with a 17-game scoring streak, the longest by a defenceman in NHL history.

MacInnis finished second amongst NHL defencemen in scoring in 1989–90 with 90 points and was named a First Team All-Star for the first time. He improved to a career high 103 points the following year, becoming the first Flames' defenceman and only the fourth in NHL history to record a 100-point season. He scored his 563rd career point in a January 8, 1991, game against Toronto, to surpass Kent Nilsson as the franchise's all-time scoring leader. MacInnis missed three months of the 1992–93 season when he suffered a dislocated hip during a game on November 11, 1992, against the Hartford Whalers. While chasing a puck at high speed, he lost control and crashed into the end boards after Hartford rookie Patrick Poulin shoved MacInnis with his stick. Three weeks after his return to action, on February 23, 1993, MacInnis set a Flames franchise record when he appeared in his 706th career game.

Following five consecutive seasons where the Flames failed to advance past the first round of the playoffs, both MacInnis and the team were looking for a change in the summer of 1994. Though the Flames made an offer of C$2.5 million per season for MacInnis, he instead signed an offer sheet with the St. Louis Blues for US$3.5 million a season for four years, making him the fourth highest-paid player in the NHL. As MacInnis was a restricted free agent, the Blues sent defenceman Phil Housley and two second round draft picks to the Flames in compensation while also receiving a fourth round selection back.

MacInnis said his decision to leave Calgary was not easy to make given his family was from the city. He claimed money was not the only reason he signed with the Blues, stating that he wanted a new challenge. He left Calgary after 11 full NHL seasons as the franchise's all-time leader in scoring with 822 points, and led in assists (603), games played (803), playoff assists (77) and playoff points (103). He appeared in six All-Star Games with Calgary and was named a league all-star five times: twice on the first team and three times on the second. The team honoured MacInnis as the first player inducted into their "Forever a Flame" program in 2012. His jersey number 2 was raised to the Saddledome rafters on February 27, 2012, but was not formally retired.

St. Louis Blues
Pneumonia and a late-season shoulder injury limited MacInnis to 28 points in 32 games in 1994–95, a season itself reduced to 48 games by a labour dispute. While he returned to play in the postseason, MacInnis required off-season surgery to repair the damage to his shoulder. He returned to health in 1995–96, appearing in all 82 games for the Blues. Early in his third season with the Blues, MacInnis played his 1,000th game in an October 23, 1997, match-up against the Vancouver Canucks. However he again suffered a separation of his surgically repaired shoulder in December 1997, an injury that forced him out of the Blues line-up for three weeks.

MacInnis scored a goal and an assist in a 5–3 loss to the Detroit Red Wings on April 7, 1998, to become just the sixth defenceman in NHL history to score 1,000 points. After coming close several times, MacInnis finally won the Norris Trophy as the league's top defenceman in 1998–99. Early in the 2000–01 season, MacInnis recorded four assists in a 5–2 victory over the Florida Panthers to set a Blues franchise record for scoring by a defenceman. He reached the mark with his 300th point, scored in his 424th game with the organization.

When Chris Pronger broke his arm early in the 2002–03 NHL season, MacInnis was named interim captain for the remainder of the season. He completed the season as the league's leader in scoring amongst defencemen with 68 points. Pronger insisted that MacInnis remain captain permanently when he returned for the 2003–04 season. MacInnis played only three games that season as vision problems he suffered during an October 2003 game against the Nashville Predators were diagnosed as being the result of a detached retina in one eye – the same eye in which he suffered a serious injury after being struck by a high stick in 2001. He missed the remainder of the season as a result and after the 2004–05 NHL season was cancelled due to a labour dispute, MacInnis felt that he could not return to the game at a high enough level to compete.

MacInnis announced his retirement as a player on September 9, 2005, but remained with the Blues organization as part of its marketing and hockey operations departments. Ending his career with 1,274 points, MacInnis ranked third all-time in goals, assists and points amongst defencemen, and played in six additional All-Star Games as a member of the Blues. The team retired his jersey number 2 on April 9, 2006, and honoured him with a bronze statue out front of the Scottrade Center in 2009. MacInnis was inducted to the Hockey Hall of Fame in 2007. He was the first player from Nova Scotia so honoured, and was also inducted into the Nova Scotia Sport Hall of Fame and the St. Louis Sports Hall of Fame.

International
MacInnis was a member of the Canadian national team on four occasions. He first represented Canada at the 1990 Men's World Ice Hockey Championships where he scored one goal and four points. One year later, he played in his only Canada Cup tournament. He scored two goals and four assists and was named a tournament all-star as Canada won the title over the United States. He suffered a separated shoulder shortly before the 1998 Winter Olympics, and while it was feared he would be unavailable for the tournament as a result, recovered in time to be cleared to play. MacInnis scored two goals during the tournament, but Canada finished in fourth place after losing the bronze medal match to Finland following a semi-final loss to the Czech Republic. MacInnis also participated in the 2002 Winter Olympics. Though he scored no points in the tournament, Canada defeated the United States to win the nation's first gold medal in hockey in 50 years.

Playing style

MacInnis was best known for the power and accuracy of his slapshot. The Flames selected him in the 1981 Draft on the strength of his shot alone; his skating ability was so poor when he arrived for his first training camp in Calgary he earned the nickname "Chopper". While some reporters expected he would be a bust as a result, MacInnis said the patience the Flames showed him in his early days as a professional allowed him to develop into a more complete defenceman.

The power of his shot grew into legend on January 17, 1984, in a game against St. Louis. In his first full season with the Flames, MacInnis took a slapshot from just outside the Blues' defensive zone that struck goaltender Mike Liut on the mask. The shot split Liut's helmet while the puck fell into the net for a goal. The power of his shot, and the fear it inspired in his opposition, led to MacInnis' success as an offensive-defenceman, especially as a threat on the power play. MacInnis resisted the transition to carbon-fiber sticks in the late 1990s and early 2000s. The new stick technology offering better flexing characteristics and increased shot speed, but MacInnis preferred the feel of traditional wooden sticks. He continued to win "Hardest Shot" events at All-Star Game skills competitions despite competing with the technologically inferior wooden sticks. He won the event a total of seven times between 1991 and 2003. He occasionally topped , including his win in the 2000 All-Star Game.

Used primarily as a power play specialist in his first years as a professional, MacInnis worked at improving his overall game such that he was named a Norris Trophy finalist three consecutive seasons between 1989 and 1991, and was the runner-up to Ray Bourque in 1991. He finally won the Norris Trophy as the league's top defenceman in 1999 with the Blues. Former teammate Doug Gilmour praised MacInnis' passing ability. MacInnis's play developed to the point where he was as valued for his defensive ability on the penalty kill as he was his offence on the power play.

Off the ice
MacInnis married his wife Jackie shortly after winning the Stanley Cup in 1989, and the couple have four children, Carson, Ryan, Lauren and Riley. MacInnis settled in St. Louis following his retirement, and in 2006 was named the Blues' Vice-President of Hockey Operations. He coaches his children's minor hockey teams, and in 2008–09 coached the St. Louis Junior AAA Blues to a 73–3–2 record and the championship title at the 50th Quebec International Pee-Wee Hockey Tournament. His son Ryan was a member of the Kitchener Rangers, and was drafted by the Arizona Coyotes in the 2014 NHL Entry Draft. His daughter Lauren has committed to play ice hockey at Northeastern University.

Though his career took him away from Nova Scotia, MacInnis remains involved with his hometown. In 2001, he committed C$100,000 towards a major renovation of the Port Hood Arena. The arena was renamed the Al MacInnis Sports Centre in his honour, and he hosts an annual golf tournament to help raise funds for the arena commission. On the day he was inducted into the Nova Scotia Sport Hall of Fame, he donated $100,000 to the Inverness County Memorial Hospital in the memory of his parents.

In 2018 he finished third to hockey superstar Sidney Crosby and curler Colleen Jones in a listing of the greatest 15 athletes in Nova Scotia's history.

Career statistics

Regular season and playoffs

International

Awards and honours

See also
 List of NHL statistical leaders

References

External links

*NOTE: MacInnis also served as captain for nearly the entire 2002–03 NHL season, while Chris Pronger was injured and out of the line-up. MacInnis was then named the captain for the 2003–04 season, but MacInnis suffered a career-ending injury.

1963 births
Living people
Calgary Flames draft picks
Calgary Flames players
Canadian expatriate ice hockey players in the United States
Canadian ice hockey defencemen
Canadian people of Scottish descent
Colorado Flames players
Conn Smythe Trophy winners
Hockey Hall of Fame inductees
Ice hockey people from Nova Scotia
Ice hockey players at the 1998 Winter Olympics
Ice hockey players at the 2002 Winter Olympics
James Norris Memorial Trophy winners
Kitchener Rangers players
Medalists at the 2002 Winter Olympics
National Hockey League All-Stars
National Hockey League first-round draft picks
National Hockey League players with retired numbers
Olympic gold medalists for Canada
Olympic ice hockey players of Canada
Olympic medalists in ice hockey
People from Inverness County, Nova Scotia
Nova Scotia Sport Hall of Fame inductees
Regina Pats players
St. Louis Blues executives
St. Louis Blues players
Stanley Cup champions